The All-Ireland Senior B Hurling Championship of 1981 was the eighth staging of Ireland's secondary hurling knock-out competition.  Antrim won the championship, beating London 3-17 to 3-14 in the final at Fr. Healy Park, Loughguile.

Results

All-Ireland Senior B Hurling Championship

First round

Quarter-final

Semi-finals

Home final

Final

References

 Donegan, Des, The Complete Handbook of Gaelic Games (DBA Publications Limited, 2005).

1981
1981 in Northern Ireland sport
B